Charles Martin Bowman (May 7, 1863 – October 24, 1932) was a politician in Ontario, Canada. He was a Liberal member of the Legislative Assembly of Ontario who represented the ridings of Bruce North from 1898 to 1914 and Bruce West from 1914 to 1919.

Background
Bowman was born in St. Jacobs, Canada West, the son of Isaac Erb Bowman, and educated there and in Berlin (later Kitchener, Ontario). He entered his father's tanning business and set up a tannery in Southampton in 1882. After a fire destroyed that business, he purchased a tannery at Port Elgin. He went on to operate a furniture business in Southampton. With James Conmee, Bowman was awarded a contract for construction on the Algoma Central Railway. In 1902 he and James Whalen, son-in-law of Liberal M.P. James Conmee, formed the Great Lakes Dredging Company, obtaining large contracts to dredge the Fort William and Port Arthur harbors. In 1886, he married Louisa Hesse. He resided in Southampton, Saugeen Township, Bruce County in 1920, continuing his involvement in the leather business. He died in Kitchener, Ontario in 1932.

Charles Martin Bowman: Elected Director of Mutual Life Assurance Co. of Canada 1916, and Chairman in 1926. Chairman of the Board of Mutual Life Assurance Co. of Canada; President: Colonization Finance Corp. Ltd.; Director: Durham Furniture Co. Ltd.,; Director: Canada Colonization association. Ref.: Who's Who in Canada, Advance Press Service

Politics
Bowman served on the town council for Southampton and also served as reeve for the town.

In the 1898 provincial election, he ran as the Liberal candidate in the riding of Bruce North. He defeated Conservative candidate D.M. Jormyn by 419 votes.

References

External links
 
A History of Ontario : its resources and development. Part II, A Fraser (1907)

1863 births
1932 deaths
Mayors of places in Ontario
Ontario Liberal Party MPPs
People from Woolwich, Ontario